The College Avenue Historic District in Appleton, Wisconsin is a  historic district that was listed on the National Register of Historic Places in 1982.  In 1982, it included 27 buildings deemed to contribute to the historic character of the area, one of which is the 12 story Zuelke Building, and one contributing object, the Soldiers Square Civil War Monument.

The contributing buildings include:

Zuelke Building, 103 W. College Avenue, a twelve-story gray granite building.  Its interior is one of few intact original interiors
in the district.
Gibson's Auto Exchange, at 211 W. College Avenue, Art Deco.
Bissing Building, 203-205 W. College Avenue, with lions' heads in its roofline pediments.  In 1982 two commercial establishments, Boot Hill and Brown Beam Tavern, occupied the building.

References

Appleton, Wisconsin
Geography of Outagamie County, Wisconsin
Historic districts on the National Register of Historic Places in Wisconsin
National Register of Historic Places in Outagamie County, Wisconsin